(466 — 25 January 536) was the 27th legendary Emperor of Japan, according to the traditional order of succession.

No firm dates can be assigned to this Emperor's life or reign, but he is conventionally considered to have reigned from 10 March 531 to 25 January 536.

Legendary narrative
According to the Kojiki, later Emperor Ankan, was the elder son of Emperor Keitai, who is considered to have ruled the country during the early-6th century, though there is a paucity of information about him. When Ankan was 66 years old, Keitai abdicated in favor of him.

Ankan's contemporary title would not have been tennō, as most historians believe this title was not introduced until the reigns of Emperor Tenmu and Empress Jitō. Rather, it was presumably , meaning "the great king who rules all under heaven".

The most noteworthy event recorded during his reign was the construction of state granaries in large numbers throughout Japan, indicating the broad reach of imperial power at the time.

Ankan's grave is traditionally associated with the Takayatsukiyama kofun in Habikino, Osaka.

Genealogy
Empress: , Emperor Ninken's daughter

Consort: , Kose no Ohito no Ōomi's daughter

Consort: , Kose no Ohito no Ōomi's daughter

Consort: , Mononobe no Itabi no Ōomuraji's daughter

First son: Imperial Prince Ako.

Second son: Prince Kibu

Third son: Prince Akihinohohoshika, later Emperor Kinmei

Ancestry

See also
 Emperor of Japan
 List of Emperors of Japan
 Imperial cult

Notes

References
 Aston, William George. (1896).  Nihongi: Chronicles of Japan from the Earliest Times to A.D. 697. London: Kegan Paul, Trench, Trubner. 
 Brown, Delmer M. and Ichirō Ishida, eds. (1979).  Gukanshō: The Future and the Past. Berkeley: University of California Press. ; 
 Ponsonby-Fane, Richard Arthur Brabazon. (1959).  The Imperial House of Japan. Kyoto: Ponsonby Memorial Society. 
 Titsingh, Isaac. (1834). Nihon Ōdai Ichiran; ou,  Annales des empereurs du Japon.  Paris: Royal Asiatic Society, Oriental Translation Fund of Great Britain and Ireland. 
 Varley, H. Paul. (1980).  Jinnō Shōtōki: A Chronicle of Gods and Sovereigns. New York: Columbia University Press. ; 

 
 

Japanese emperors
People of Kofun-period Japan
6th-century monarchs in Asia
6th-century Japanese monarchs
466 births
536 deaths